Sport Hotel is a four-star resort hotel in  Soldeu, Andorra. It has 148 rooms. Originally established as a resort village in 1972, Sport Hotel became Soldeu's first 4-star hotel when it opened in 1987.

References

External links
Website

Hotels in Andorra

Hotel buildings completed in 1987